Vivacitas (subtitled "Live at Glasgow 2002") is a live album recorded by the Nice, who reformed for a set of concerts, augmented by the Keith Emerson Band for the second half of the concert. David O'List, The Nice's original guitarist, did not take part, and was replaced by Dave Kilminster. The album consists of versions of pieces which had been live favourites during the Nice's heyday between 1967 and 1970, three piano solo pieces by Emerson, some pieces from the Emerson, Lake & Palmer repertoire performed by the Keith Emerson Band, and a 2001 interview with Emerson, Lee Jackson and Brian Davison by Chris Welch.

Track listing

Disc one
"America"/"Rondo" (Bernstein, Brubeck, Emerson) – 11:13
"Little Arabella" (Emerson, Jackson) – 4:57
"She Belongs to Me" (Dylan, Emerson) – 6:21
"The Cry of Eugene" (Emerson, Jackson, O'List) – 5:02
"Hang on to a Dream" (Emerson, Hardin) – 10:30
"Country Pie" (Bach, Dylan, Emerson) – 5:57
"Karelia Suite" (Sibelius, Emerson) – 7:58

Disc two
"A Blade of Grass" (Emerson) – 2:11
"A Cajun Alley" (Emerson) – 4:11
"Tarkus" (Emerson, Lake) – 21:00
"Hoedown" (Copland) – 5:06
"Fanfare for the Common Man" (Copland, Emerson, Lake, Palmer) – 7:55
"Honky Tonk Train Blues" (Meade Lux Lewis) – 6:05

Disc three
 Interview with Chris Welch – 22:27

Personnel
The Nice
Keith Emerson – keyboards
Lee Jackson – bass guitar, vocals  (1-7, 12-13)
Brian Davison – drums  (1-7, 12-13)
Additional personnel
Dave Kilminster – guitar, vocals  (1-7, 10-13)
Phil Williams – bass guitar  (10-13)
Pete Riley – drums  (10-13)

References

The Nice albums
Interview albums
2002 live albums
Sanctuary Records live albums